Government Medical College or Shaikh-Ul-Hind Maulana Mahmood Hasan Medical College or S.M.M.H. Medical College is a state medical college located  in Saharanpur.  It was inspected by MCI and given letter of permission for admission of first foundation batch in 2015.

Courses
Since 2015, 100 students were  allowed to take admission in the M.B.B.S .  Admission will be by  single competitive examination. The NEET-UG accounts for both the filling of 15% all India quota seats and remaining 85% state quota seats.

References

External links
 Official website

Medical colleges in Uttar Pradesh
Education in Saharanpur
Mahmud Hasan Deobandi